The 2022 iHeartRadio Music Awards were held at the Shrine Auditorium in Los Angeles on March 22, 2022, and was broadcast live on Fox from 8:00 PM to 10:00 PM EDT. The ceremony was returned to its traditional March schedule after the last two events were altered or postponed due to the COVID-19 pandemic, it was hosted by American rapper and actor LL Cool J.

Performances
Performers were announced on March 9, 2022, through the iHeartRadio website.

Winners and nominees
iHeartRadio announced the nominees on January 27, 2022.

Winners are listed first and in bold

References

2022
2022 music awards
2022 in Los Angeles
2022 awards in the United States
March 2022 events in the United States